The Men's high jump event at the 2011 World Championships in Athletics was held at the Daegu Stadium on August 30 and September 1.

It took a clean round up to 2.28 just to get into the final.  In the final, seven competitors cleared 2.32, with only Jesse Williams and Trevor Barry maintaining a clean record.  At 2.35, Williams maintained that clean streak, clearing on his first attempt, which ultimately won the gold medal.  Only Aleksey Dmitrik was able to match that height, but it was on his second attempt as were all of his last three clearances in the competition.

Medalists

Records

Qualification standards

Schedule

Results

Qualification
Qualification: Qualifying Performance 2.31 (Q) or at least 12 best performers (q) advance to the final.

Final

References

External links
High jump results at IAAF website

High jump
High jump at the World Athletics Championships